Saint Helena's Church or St Helena's Church may refer to:

 St. Helen's Church, Lundy, Devon, UK is often incorrectly called St. Helena's.
 St. Helena's Church, Thoroton, Nottinghamshire, UK
 St. Helena's Church, West Leake, Nottinghamshire, UK
 St. Helena's Church (Bronx, New York), USA
 Parish Church of St. Helena, Beaufort, South Carolina, USA